is a Japanese football player.

Playing career
A product of Gamba Osaka U-15 alongside the Japanese superstar Keisuke Honda, Tanaka started his professional career in Japan with Omiya Ardija. He remained at the club for five seasons being selected to the Japan National Team U-21 in 2006, before joining Yokohama FC on loan in 2009. Following an impressive first season with Yokohama, Tanaka's contract was purchased by his new club. He began the 2010 season with Yokohama, but at the mid-way point of the season was sent on loan to Sagan Tosu and remained at the club for the 2011 season.

He was scouted at the Japan Pro-Footballers Association (JPFA) Tryout in Japan, and in February 2012, he came to the United States as a trialist for the MLS club Real Salt Lake during their preseason camp.   On March 1, 2012, it was announced that Tanaka was signed by the club.  Tanaka made his MLS debut as part of the Starting XI in a match against the Montreal Impact on April 4, 2012, becoming the second Japanese player in Major League Soccer (after Kosuke Kimura of the Colorado Rapids).  On May 26 of the same year, his first assist in the MLS came on a goal by Alvaro Saborio in a match against FC Dallas.

Tanaka was released by the club following the signing of Kenny Mansally.

Following his departure from Major League Soccer he first signed with PTT Rayong F.C. in Thailand And in 2014, instantly was acquired by Sisaket F.C. in the Thai Premier League.

Club statistics

References

External links

1985 births
Living people
Association football people from Osaka Prefecture
Japanese footballers
People from Ibaraki, Osaka
J1 League players
J2 League players
Major League Soccer players
Omiya Ardija players
Yokohama FC players
Sagan Tosu players
Real Salt Lake players
Expatriate soccer players in the United States
Japanese expatriate sportspeople in the United States
Expatriate footballers in Thailand
Footballers at the 2006 Asian Games
Association football defenders
Asian Games competitors for Japan
Association football midfielders